Dębice may refer to:

Dębice, Lower Silesian Voivodeship (south-west Poland)
Dębice, Kuyavian-Pomeranian Voivodeship (north-central Poland)
Dębice, Greater Poland Voivodeship (west-central Poland)
Dębice, West Pomeranian Voivodeship (north-west Poland)
Kolonia Dębice

See also
Dębica